Ironclad: Battle for Blood is a 2014 epic war film directed by Jonathan English. It is the sequel to his 2011 film Ironclad.

Plot
Five years after the events of Ironclad, the de Vesci family struggles with Scot raiders along the English-Scottish border. A blood feud begins after the Scot chieftain's son is killed in one of these raids. The wounded de Vesci patriarch, Gilbert, sends his son Hubert to seek help from his nephew, a "great warrior" named Guy de Lusignan.

This Guy is revealed to be none other than Baron d'Aubigny's idealistic squire from Ironclad. Unable to find peace after the events at Rochester, he has grown into a cynical, hard-bitten fighting man who makes a living in mercenary work and underground bloodsports. Shrugging off Hubert’s appeal to family, he demands payment for his services and those of his partner Berenger, forcing Hubert to hand over the last of the de Vesci fortune. To bolster their numbers, Guy saves a condemned murderer called Crazy Mary with a bribe, but end up getting "two for the price of one" when authorities come after the headsman, Pierrepoint, for selling prisoners.

Hubert leads the four mercenaries back to the besieged de Vesci castle, and they help the garrison beat back the Scot attacks. Guy's reunion with his relations proves awkward. His beautiful, spoiled cousin Blanche spurns him at first, especially after learning that he came for money instead of family, but begins to warm to him after he saves her from Scot infiltrators. Mary seduces Hubert and they start a secret relationship.

Casualties mount as the siege drags on. Gilbert de Vesci dies of his wound, passing his lordship on to Hubert. His wife Joan later takes poison to join him, believing the battle lost. Pierrepoint is murdered by Mary, who held a grudge against her would-be executioner. At last, the Scots resort to fire, burning down the castle gates and storming the keep. Berenger, caught outside, nearly wins a duel with the Scot chieftain before the raiders interrupt and kill him. Hubert entrusts his sisters to Guy before making a last stand with Mary as lord of the castle.

The Scots overpower Hubert and Mary, executing the latter by hanging. To spare Hubert the same fate, Guy recalls his honor and heritage and challenges the Scot chieftain to single combat. He emerges victorious with unexpected help from Blanche. With their leader dead, the clan renounces the blood feud and returns to the hills. An epilogue narrated by Hubert reveals that despite his apparent change of heart at the siege’s end, Guy stayed on the mercenary path, and went on to ply his trade in the Hundred Years' War in France.

Cast
 Tom Austen as Guy de Lusignan, a hardened mercenary who fought as a squire at the famous siege of Rochester Castle
 David Rintoul as Gilbert de Vesci, a former Crusader and lord of the de Vesci castle
 Michelle Fairley as Joan de Vesci, Gilbert’s wife
 Tom Rhys Harries as Hubert de Vesci, Gilbert’s son
 Roxanne McKee as Blanche de Vesci, Gilbert’s spoiled older daughter  
 Rosie Day as Kate de Vesci, Gilbert’s younger daughter 
 Danny Webb as Smith, Gilbert’s doughty manservant
 David Caves as Berenger, Guy’s friend and fellow mercenary who owes him a life debt
 Twinnie Lee Moore as Crazy Mary, a condemned murderer
 Andy Beckwith as Pierrepoint (Charles Montserrat de Pierrepoint III), an executioner
 Predrag Bjelac as Maddog, chieftain of the Scot raiders

Reception
Guy Lodge of Variety wrote that English "rehashes most of his technical devices from the first film" and noted that the "production and costume design on the Serbian-shot production are economically restrained," though "Andreas Weidinger’s kitschily choral score is anything but."

Criticism
In the closing sequence, Guy is said to go on to fight in the Hundred Years' War. As the event in the film are said to take place in 1221 and the Hundred Years' War started in 1337, Guy would be 116 years older when he went to fight in France as a mercenary.

References

External links
 

2014 films
2014 action drama films
2010s historical films
2014 war drama films
2010s action war films
English-language Serbian films
British action drama films
British epic films
British historical films
British sequel films
British war drama films
Films about death
Films about violence
Films set in castles
Films set in the 13th century
Films shot in Serbia
Historical epic films
Historical action films
Serbian action films
Serbian war drama films
War epic films
British action war films
2010s English-language films
Films directed by Jonathan English
2010s British films